The Kosovo University Sports Federation,  (/ Savez Univerzitetskog Sporta Kosova), is governing body for university sports in Kosovo.

History
The Kosovo University Sports Federation became a member of the International University Sports Federation in 2017 and a delegation representing Kosovo made its debut at the 2019 Summer Universiade.

Kosovo at the World University Games

Summer

Winter

Events Hosted
The Kosovo University Sports Federation has hosted the following FISU events:

2022 FISU University Handball World Cup

See also
List of universities in Kosovo

References

External links
Kosovo University Sports Federation

Sports governing bodies in Kosovo
Kosovo at the Summer Universiade
Kosovo at the Winter Universiade
Kosovo at the Universiade